Abu al-Qasim Ahmad ibn Muhammad al-Iraqi al-Simāwi (d.1260?) was a Muslim Alchemist from Baghdad who performed various experiments and was the famous author of Kitāb al-ʿIlm al-muktasab fī zirāʿat al-dhahab ("The Book of Acquired Knowledge concerning the Cultivation of Gold"). Al-Jildaki was deeply inspired by his works and wrote various commentaries and references regarding the works of Al-Simawi.

References

Alchemists of the medieval Islamic world